Uriel da Costa (also Acosta or d'Acosta; c. 1585 – April 1640) was a Portuguese philosopher and skeptic who was born Christian, but returned to Judaism and ended up questioning the Catholic and rabbinic institutions of his time.

Life
Many details about his life appear in his short autobiography, but over the past two centuries documents uncovered in Portugal, Amsterdam, Hamburg and more have changed and added much in the picture.

Costa was born in Porto with the name Gabriel da Costa Fiuza. His ancestors were Cristãos-novos, or New Christians, converted from Judaism to Catholicism by state edict at 1497. His father was a well-off international merchant and tax-farmer.

Studying canon law in the University of Coimbra intermittently between 1600 and 1608, he began to read the Bible and contemplate it seriously. Costa also occupied an ecclesiastical office. In his autobiography Costa pictured his family as devout Catholics. However they had been subjects to several investigations by the Inquisition, suggesting they were Conversos, more or less close to Jewish customs. Gabriel explicitly supported the adherence to Mosaic prescriptions as well as traditional ones.

After his father died, the family came into greater financial difficulties due to some debts that had not been paid. In 1614 they changed this predicament as they sneaked out of Portugal with a significant sum of money they previously collected as tax-farmers for Jorge de Mascarenhas. Then the family headed to two major Sephardic diaspora communities. Newly circumcised, and with new Jewish names, two brothers settled in Amsterdam, and two with their mother in Hamburg. Gabriel was in the latter city, and became Uriel for the Jewish neighbors, and Adam Romez for outside relations, presumably because he was wanted in Portugal. All resumed their international trade business.

Upon arriving there, Costa quickly became disenchanted with the kind of Judaism he saw in practice. He came to believe that the rabbinic leadership was too consumed by ritualism and legalistic posturing. His earliest known written message is known as Propostas contra a Tradição (Propositions against the Tradition). In eleven short theses he called into question the disparity between certain Jewish customs and a literal reading of the Law of Moses, and more generally tried to prove from reason and scripture that this system of law is sufficient. In 1616 the text was dispatched to the leaders of the prominent Jewish community in Venice. The Venetians ruled against it and prompted the Hamburg community to sanction Costa with a herem, or excommunication. The Objections are extant only as quotes and paraphrases in Magen ṿe-tsinah (מגן וצנה; "Shield and Buckler"), a longer rebuttal by Leon of Modena, of the Venice community, who responded to religious queries about Costa sent by the Hamburg Jewish authorities.

Costa's 1616 attempts resulted in official excommunication in Venice and Hamburg. It is not known what effect this had on his life; Costa barely mentions it in his autobiography, and he would continue his international business. In 1623 he moved to Amsterdam for an unknown reason. The leaders of the Amsterdam Sephardic community were troubled by the arrival of a known heretic, staged a hearing and approved the excommunication set by the previous authorities.

At about the same time (in Hamburg or Amsterdam) Costa was working on a second treatise. Three chapters of the unpublished manuscript were stolen, and formed the target for a traditionalist rebuttal quickly published by Semuel da Silva of Hamburg; so Costa enlarged his book and the printed version already contains responses and revisions to the crux of the tract.

In 1623 Costa published the Portuguese book  (Examination of Pharisaic Traditions). Costa's second work spans more than 200 pages. In the first part it develops his earlier Propositons, taking into account Modena's responses and corrections. In the second part he adds his newer views that the Hebrew Bible, especially the Torah, does not support the idea of immortality of the soul. Costa believed that this was not an idea deeply rooted in biblical Judaism, but rather had been formulated primarily by later Pharisaic rabbis, and promoted to a Jewish principles of faith. The work further pointed out the discrepancies between biblical Judaism and Rabbinic Judaism; he declared the latter to be an accumulation of mechanical ceremonies and practices. In his view, it was thoroughly devoid of spiritual and philosophical concepts. Costa was relatively early in teaching to Jewish readership in favor of the mortality of the soul, and in appealing exclusively to direct reading of the bible. He cites neither rabbinic authorities nor philosophers of the Aristotelian and Neoplatonic traditions.

The book became very controversial among the local Jewish community, whose leaders reported to the city authorities this was an attack on Christianity as well as on Judaism, and it was burned publicly. He was fined a significant sum. In 1627 Costa was a denizen of Utrecht. The Amsterdam community still had an uncomfortable relationship with him; they queried a Venetian rabbi, Yaakov Ha-Levi, whether his elderly mother is eligible for a burial lot in their city; the next year the mother died and Uriel went back to Amsterdam. Ultimately, the loneliness was too much for him to handle, Around 1633 he accepted the terms of reconciliation, which he does not detail in his autobiography, and was reaccepted into the community.

Shortly after that Costa was tried again; he encountered two Christians who expressed to him their desire to convert to Judaism. In accordance with his views, he dissuaded them from doing so. Based on this and earlier accusations regarding kashrut, he was excommunicated. As he describes it, for seven years he lived in virtual isolation, shunned by his family and embroiled in civil-financial disputes with them. In search for legal help, he decided to go back being "an ape amongst the apes"; he would follow the traditions and practices, but with little real conviction. He sought a way of reconciliation. As a punishment for his heretical views, Costa was publicly given 39 lashes at the Portuguese synagogue in Amsterdam. He was then forced to lie on the floor while the congregation trampled over him. This left him both demoralized and seeking revenge against the man (a cousin or nephew) who brought about his trial, seven years previously.

The humiliating ceremony makes the final dramatic point of his autobiography. This document is a few pages long, and was transmitted to print in Latin some decades after his death, with the title Exemplar Humanae Vitae (Example of a Human Life). It tells the story of his life and intellectual development, his experience as a victim of intolerance. It also expresses rationalistic and skeptical views: It doubts whether biblical law was divinely sanctioned or whether it was simply written down by Moses. It suggests that all religion was a human invention, and specifically rejects formalized, ritualized religion. It sketches a religion to be based only on natural law, as god has no use for empty ceremony, nor for violence and strife.

Two reports agree that Costa committed suicide in Amsterdam in 1640: Johannes Müller, a Protestant theologian of Hamburg gives the time as April, and Amsterdam Remonstrant preacher Philipp van Limborch adds that he set out to end the lives of both his brother (or nephew) and himself. Seeing his relative approach one day, he grabbed a pistol and pulled the trigger, but it misfired. Then he reached for another, turned it on himself, and fired, dying a reportedly terrible death.

Influence

Ultimately there have been many ways to view Uriel da Costa. In his lifetime, his book Examinations inspired not only Silva's answer, but also Menasseh ben Israel's more lasting De Resurrectione Mortuorum (1636) directed against the "Sadducees", and a listing in the Index of Prohibited Books.

After his death, his name became synonymous with the Exemplar Humanae Vitae. Müller publicized Costa's excommunication, to make an anachronistic point that some Sephardic Jews of his days are Sadducees. Johann Helwig Willemer made the same point, and implied that this extreme heresy leads to suicide.  Pierre Bayle reported the contents of the Exemplar quite fully, to demonstrate among other things that questioning religion without turning to revelation would bring one to miserable faithlessness.

The later Enlightenment saw Costa's Rational Religion more tolerantly. Herder eulogized him as a crusader of authentic belief. Voltaire noted that he quit Judaism for Philosophy. Reimarus embraced Costa's appeal to have legal status based on the Seven Laws of Noah, when he made an analogous argument that Christian states should be at least as tolerant toward modern Deists as ancient Israelites had been.

Internally to Judaism, he has been seen as both a troublemaking heretic or as martyr against the intolerance of the Rabbinic establishment. He has also been seen as a precursor to Baruch Spinoza and to modern biblical criticism.

Costa is also indicative of the difficulty that many Marranos faced upon their arrival in an organized Jewish community. As a Crypto-Jew in Iberia, he read the Bible and was impressed by it. Yet upon confronting an organized Rabbinic community, he was not equally impressed by the established ritual and religious doctrine of Rabbinical Judaism, such as the Oral Law.  As da Costa himself pointed out, traditional Pharisee and Rabbinic doctrine had been contested in the past by the Sadducees and the present by the Karaites.

Works based upon Costa's life
 In 1846, in the midst of the liberal milieu that led to the Revolutions of 1848, the German writer Karl Gutzkow (1811–1878) wrote Uriel Acosta, a play about Costa's life. This would later become the first classic play to be translated into Yiddish, and it was a longtime standard of Yiddish theater; Uriel Acosta is the signature role of the actor Rafalesco, the protagonist of Sholem Aleichem's Wandering Stars. The first translation into Yiddish was by Osip Mikhailovich Lerner, who staged the play at the Mariinski Theater in Odessa, Ukraine (then part of Imperial Russia) in 1881, shortly after the assassination of Tsar Alexander II. Abraham Goldfaden rapidly followed with a rival production, an operetta, at Odessa's Remesleni Club. Georgian composer Tamara Vakhvakhishvili also composed music for the play.
 Israel Rosenberg promptly followed with his own translation for a production in Łódź (in modern-day Poland). Rosenberg's production starred Jacob Adler in the title role; the play would remain a signature piece in Adler's repertoire to the end of his stage career, the first of the several roles through which he developed the persona that he referred to as "the Grand Jew" (see also Adler's Memoir in the References below).
 Hermann Jellinek (brother of Adolf Jellinek) wrote a book entitled Uriel Acosta (1848).
 Israel Zangwill used the life of Uriel da Costa as one of several fictionalized biographies in his book Dreamers of the Ghetto.
 Agustina Bessa-Luís, Portuguese writer (1922–2019), published in 1984 the novel Um Bicho da Terra ("An Animal of the Earth") based on Uriel's life.

Writings

  (Propositions against the Tradition), ca. 1616. An untitled letter addressed at certain Rabbis, opposing their extra-biblical traditions.
  (Examination of Pharisaic Traditions), 1623. Here, Costa argues that the human soul is not immortal.
  (Latin for Example of a human life), 1640. Costa's life, questions the authorship of Torah, and expresses trust in natural law.

See also
 Criticism of Judaism
 Criticism of the Talmud

Notes

References
 
 Salomon, Herman Prins, and Sassoon, I.S.D., (trans. and intr.), Examination of Pharisaic Traditions – : Facsimile of the Unique Copy in the Royal Library of Copenhagen, Leiden, E. J. Brill, 1993.
 Nadler, Steven, Spinoza: A Life, Cambridge, Cambridge University Press, 1999.
 Popkin, Richard H., Spinoza, Oxford, Oneworld Publications, 2004.
 
 Nadler, Steven, Menasseh ben Israel, Rabbi of Amsterdam, New Haven, Yale University Press, 2018.
 Adler, Jacob, A Life on the Stage: A Memoir, translated and with commentary by Lulla Rosenfeld, Knopf, New York, 1999, pp. 200 et. seq.
 Tradizione e illuminismo in Uriel da Costa. Fonti, temi, questioni dell', edited by O. Proietti e G. Licata, eum, Macerata 2016 Index

External links

 International committee Uriel da Costa 
 Bertao, David. Uriel da Costa The Tragic Life of Uriel Da Costa
 Who Was Uriel Da Costa? by Dr. Henry Henry Abramson

17th-century philosophers
1580s births
1640 deaths
Dutch Sephardi Jews
Jewish Portuguese writers
Portuguese philosophers
People from Porto
Converts to Judaism from Roman Catholicism
Jewish philosophers
Jewish skeptics
16th-century Sephardi Jews
17th-century Sephardi Jews
Suicides by firearm in the Netherlands
Curiel family
Uriel Acosta
Critics of Judaism
Skeptics
17th-century Portuguese people
16th-century Portuguese people
Philosophers of religion
17th-century suicides